The State Bank of Townsend is a site on the National Register of Historic Places located in Townsend, Montana. It was added to the Register on January 13, 1992. The bank opened in 1899 and continues operating as a bank today.

References

Bank buildings on the National Register of Historic Places in Montana
Neoclassical architecture in Montana
Commercial buildings completed in 1918
National Register of Historic Places in Broadwater County, Montana
1918 establishments in Montana